Russia participated in the Eurovision Song Contest 2007 in Helsinki, Finland. Despite early indications that the Russian participation for 2007 would be organised by Rossiya Channel (RTR), Channel One Russia (C1R) remained in charge of selecting the Russian entry and retained the broadcast rights for the 2007 Contest. The Russian entry was selected internally by C1R. Serebro represented Russia with the song "Song #1", which placed 3rd in the final, scoring 207 points.

Before Eurovision

Internal selection 
To select Russian Eurovision representative for 2007 contest, broadcaster RTR, which regained the right to choose a participant for Russia, was rumoured to be organising a national selection with three artists selected by the channel. However, in January 2007, it was announced that Channel One had regained the right to choose the 2007 participant after RTR decided to participate in the Eurovision Dance Contest instead.  On 20 January 2007, C1R announced a submission period for interested artists and composers to submit their entries until 1 March 2007. A jury panel was to evaluate the received submissions on 3 March 2007 and select the Russian entry, however a decision was not reached and instead five candidates were shortlisted: Aleksandr Panayotov and Alexey Chumakov, Band'Eros, Gorod 312, Serebro and Zveri.

On 8 March 2007, C1R announced that they had internally selected Serebro to represent Russia in Helsinki. The announcement occurred during the Channel One programme Vysshaya Liga. Serebro's selection as the Russian representative was decided upon by the jury panel from the five shortlisted candidates following a closed audition held on the same day. The Russian song, "Song #1", was presented to the public on 14 March 2007 during a special radio programme broadcast on Europa Plus. "Song #1" was composed by creator of the group Maxim Fadeev, with lyrics by Daniil Babichev. Fadeev previously composed the 2004 Russian entry. The song was also presented on 24 March 2007 during Vysshaya Liga.

At Eurovision 

Since Russia placed within the top 10 countries (excluding the Big Four) in the 2006 Contest, Russia pre-qualified to compete directly in the final of the Eurovision Song Contest 2007. On 12 March 2007, Russia was drawn to perform 15th in the final on 12 May 2007, following a slot allotted for a semi-finalist qualifier, which was ultimately filled by Latvia and preceding Germany. After the voting concluded, Russia scored 207 points and placed 3rd.

The semi-final and final were broadcast on Channel One, with commentary by Yuriy Aksyuta and Elena Batinova. The voting spokesperson for Russia was Yana Churikova.

Voting

Points awarded to Russia

Points awarded by Russia

Notes

References

2007
Countries in the Eurovision Song Contest 2007
Eurovision
Eurovision